The Ratio Club was a small British informal dining club from 1949 to 1958 of young psychiatrists, psychologists, physiologists, mathematicians and engineers who met to discuss issues in cybernetics.

History
The idea of the club arose from a symposium on animal behaviour held in July 1949 by the Society of Experimental Biology in Cambridge.  The club was founded by the neurologist John Bates, with other notable members such as W. Ross Ashby.

The name Ratio was suggested by Albert Uttley, it being the Latin root meaning "computation or the faculty of mind which calculates, plans and reasons". He pointed out that it is also the root of rationarium, meaning a statistical account, and ratiocinatius, meaning argumentative.  The use was probably inspired by an earlier suggestion by Donald Mackay of the 'MR club', from Machina ratiocinatrix, a term used by Norbert Wiener in the introduction to his then recently published book Cybernetics, or Control and Communication in the Animal and the Machine. Wiener used the term in reference to calculus ratiocinator, a calculating machine constructed by Leibniz.

The initial membership was W. Ross Ashby, Horace Barlow, John Bates, George Dawson, Thomas Gold, W. E. Hick, Victor Little, Donald MacKay, Turner McLardy, P. A. Merton, John Pringle, Harold Shipton, Donald Sholl, Eliot Slater, Albert Uttley, W. Grey Walter and John Hugh Westcott. Alan Turing joined after the first meeting with I. J. Good, Philip Woodward and William Rushton added soon after. Giles Brindley was also a member for a short period.

The club was the most intellectually powerful and influential cybernetics grouping in the UK, and many of its members went on to become extremely prominent scientists.

References

External links 
 
 

1949 establishments in England
Scientific organizations established in 1949
Cybernetics
Dining clubs
History of artificial intelligence
Systems sciences organizations